Kollupitiye Mahinda Sangharakkhitha Thera is the Chief Incumbent (Chief Priest) of the Kelaniya Raja Maha Vihara and Head of the Buddhist and Pali Faculty of the University of Kelaniya.

Early life

Educated at the Royal College, Colombo, He was born to Appuhami  Dassanayake and Podihamine  Dassanayake of Kollupitiya, Colombo. He is the fifth in the family of four brothers and  two  sisters.  Brothers  are  Upali,  Nimal,  Nihal and Sunil and the  sisters  are  Sudharma  &  Pushpa.

Priesthood
Becoming a monk in the 1960s under the guidance of the then chief incumbent of the Kelani Temple Thalewela Vijitha Dhammarakkhitha Thera, Sangharakkhitha Thera studied scripture at the Gangarama Temple in Hunupitiya and obtained graduated from the Vidyalankara Campus of the University of Ceylon studying Buddhist Philosophy and French language. Thereafter Sangharakkhitha Thera was awarded a two-year scholarship to study at the Sorbonne University to gain a postgraduate degree in French language. After which going on to gain a Masters and doctorate from the University of Delhi.

Returning to Sri Lanka, Sangharakkhitha Thera started lecturing at the University of Kelaniya, Faculty of Buddhist and Pali, later becoming a professor. Sangharakkhitha Thera was appointed chief incumbent of the Kelaniya Raja Maha Vihara in 1992.

Sangharakkhitha Thera started a special Pirivena to teach Buddhism in the English language.

Sangharakkhitha Thera was appointed chancellor of University of Kelaniya in 2021.

References

External links
Development Boards to improve standards of schools

Living people
Theravada Buddhist monks
Sri Lankan Theravada Buddhists
Sri Lankan Buddhist monks
Sinhalese academics
Alumni of Royal College, Colombo
Delhi University alumni
University of Paris alumni
Alumni of the University of Ceylon
Academic staff of the University of Kelaniya
Year of birth missing (living people)